Ari "Lonia" Dvorin (23 October 1917 – 17 March 2000) was an Israeli football player and coach. As a player, he played as a full-back for Beitar Tel Aviv and the Mandatory Palestine national team.

Early life 
Dvorin was born on 23 October 1917 in Odessa, Ukraine, to Hannah and Pinchas. When he was two years old, he and his family emigrated to Palestine on a ship, called Ruslan.

Club career 
Dvorin began his youth career as a teenager, joining Maccabi Tel Aviv's youth sector. He left the club in 1934, aged 17, and was one of the founders of Beitar Tel Aviv. He won the 1940 Palestine Cup after beating Maccabi Tel Aviv 3–1 in the final. In 1942 he won the cup once more, beating Maccabi Haifa 12–1 in the final; he scored the last goal of the game. Dvorin played his last season in 1947–48, when Beitar Tel Aviv where top of the league; however, the 1947–1949 Palestine war interrupted the season, which was never finished.

International career 
Dvorin took part in Mandatory Palestine's last international match against Lebanon in 1940, coming on as a substitute in the second half; it was his only international cap.

Managerial career 
In 1952 Dvorin began his managerial career at Beitar Tel Aviv. Towards the end of the 1953–54 Liga Bet, the second division, Dvorin joined Beitar Jerusalem, helping them gain promotion to the first division for the first time in their history. In his career, Dvorin coached many teams, including Hapoel Be'er Sheva, Maccabi Sha'arayim, Hapoel Kfar Saba, and Maccabi Jaffa.

Personal life 
At the age of 26, Dvorin married Shulamit Goldstein and lived with her in Tel Aviv. Upon the establishment of Israel, he joined Herut, a right-wing militant paramilitary group.

Dvorin's son, Danny, is a broadcaster and sports commentator in Israel. His brother, Haim, was a judge in the Tel Aviv District Court.

Honours

Player
Beitar Tel Aviv
 Palestine League: 1944–45
 Tel Aviv Division 2: 1939
 Palestine Cup: 1940, 1942

Manager
Beitar Jerusalem
 Liga Bet: 1953–54

References

External links 
 Lonia Dvorin at Israel Football Association
 

1918 births
2000 deaths
Odesa Jews
Israeli footballers
Jewish Ukrainian sportspeople
Soviet emigrants to Mandatory Palestine
Jewish Israeli sportspeople
Association football fullbacks
Mandatory Palestine footballers
Mandatory Palestine international footballers
Maccabi Tel Aviv F.C. players
Beitar Tel Aviv F.C. players
Israeli football managers
Beitar Tel Aviv F.C. managers
Beitar Jerusalem F.C. managers
Hapoel Be'er Sheva F.C. managers
Maccabi Sha'arayim F.C. managers
Hapoel Kfar Saba F.C. managers
Maccabi Jaffa F.C. managers